The Ecuador men's national tennis team represents Ecuador in Davis Cup tennis competition and are governed by the Ecuador Tennis Federation.

Ecuador currently compete in the Americas Zone of Group I.  Their best performance was in 1985, when they advanced to the quarterfinals in the World Group.

History
Ecuador competed in its first Davis Cup in 1961.

Current team (2022) 

 Emilio Gómez
 Roberto Quiroz
 Andrés Andrade
 Diego Hidalgo
 Gonzalo Escobar (Doubles player)

Results

2000–2009

2010–2018

See also
Davis Cup
Ecuador Fed Cup team

External links

Davis Cup teams
Davis Cup
Davis Cup